Franklin is a town in New London County, Connecticut, United States. The population was 1,863 at the 2020 census. The town includes the village of North Franklin.

History
Franklin incorporated as a town in 1786. The town is named after Benjamin Franklin.

Geography

Demographics

At the 2000 census there were 1,835 people, 687 households, and 528 families living in the town. The racial makeup of the town was 97.98% White, 0.71% African American, 0.05% Native American, 0.05% Asian, 0.05% Pacific Islander, 0.05% from other races, and 1.09% from two or more races. Hispanic or Latino of any race were 1.20%.

Of the 687 households 33.8% had children under the age of 18 living with them, 66.7% were married couples living together, 6.1% had a female householder with no husband present, and 23.1% were non-families. 18.9% of households were one person and 8.7% were one person aged 65 or older.  The average household size was 2.66 and the average family size was 3.04.

The age distribution was 24.1% under the age of 18, 5.9% from 18 to 24, 29.8% from 25 to 44, 27.4% from 45 to 64, and 12.8% 65 or older.  The median age was 40 years. For every 100 females, there were 103.9 males.  For every 100 females age 18 and over, there were 100.3 males.

The median household income was $62,083 and the median family income  was $68,478. Males had a median income of $45,197 versus $31,492 for females. The per capita income for the town was $25,477.  About 1.1% of families and 2.5% of the population were below the poverty line, including 2.3% of those under age 18 and 6.0% of those age 65 or over.

Emergency services

Police 
Due to the size of Franklin, there is no police department. Instead, the town has a partnership with the Connecticut State Police (Troop K) to provide coverage in case of an emergency.

Fire Department 
Franklin's volunteer fire department is led by Chief Mark Nall. The all-volunteer department provides fire, rescue, and emergency services to the town.

Notable locations

Ashbel Woodward House – built in 1835 and added to the National Register of Historic Places in 1992.

Notable people

 Lafayette S. Foster (1806–1880), United States senator and Connecticut Supreme Court judge; born in Franklin
 Orsamus H. Marshall (1813–1884), former Chancellor of University of Buffalo
 Uriah Tracy (1755–1807), patriot, congressman, U.S. senator, and first person interred in the Congressional Cemetery; born in town

References

External links

Town of Franklin official website

 
Towns in New London County, Connecticut
Towns in Connecticut